In fluid mechanics (specifically rheology), rheoscopic fluids are fluids whose internal currents are visible as it flows. Such fluids are effective in visualizing dynamic currents, such as convection and laminar flow. They are microscopic crystalline platelets such as mica, metallic flakes, or fish scales in suspension in a fluid such as water or glycol stearate.

When the fluid is put in motion, the suspended particles orient themselves in localized, preferential alignment, larger parts of the fluid moving sheer parallel to other parts of the fluid. With appropriate illumination, the particle-filled fluid will reflect differing intensities of light.

See also
Kalliroscope
Reynolds number

External links
University of Chicago Materials Research Centre Demonstration
Instructables: Making Rheoscopic fluid

Fluid dynamics